Christian Haass (born 19 December 1960 in Mannheim, Germany) is a German biochemist who specializes in metabolic biochemistry and neuroscience.

Haass studied biology in Heidelberg from 1981 to 1985. From 1990 on he was a postdoctoral fellow in the laboratory of Dennis Selkoe at Harvard Medical School, where he worked from 1993 to 1995 as an assistant professor. Afterwards he returned to Germany as professor of molecular biology at the Central Institute of Mental Health, Mannheim. In 1999 he was offered a Chair in the medical faculty at the Ludwig Maximilian University of Munich.

The emphasis of his work is in the molecular biology and cell biology of Alzheimer's disease and Parkinson's disease. Among other awards, he has won the Leibniz Prize and the Metlife Foundation Award for Medical Research in Alzheimer's Disease.

References

Sources
Adolf Butenandt Institute - Ludwig Maximilian University of Munich
Laboratory for Neurodegenerative Disease Research
Collaborative Research Center 596 - Molecular Mechanisms of Neurodegeneration
Publications

German biochemists
1960 births
Living people
Heidelberg University alumni
Harvard Medical School people
Academic staff of the Ludwig Maximilian University of Munich
Gottfried Wilhelm Leibniz Prize winners
Members of Academia Europaea
Members of the German Academy of Sciences Leopoldina